Mihai Nemțanu (born 15 March 1979) is a Romanian former footballer who played as a forward.

Honours
Ceahlăul Piatra Neamț
Divizia B: 2005–06

References

External links
Mihai Nemțanu at Labtof.ro

1979 births
Living people
Romanian footballers
Romania youth international footballers
Romania under-21 international footballers
Association football forwards
Liga I players
Liga II players
CSM Ceahlăul Piatra Neamț players
Sportspeople from Piatra Neamț